The discography of Casey Veggies, an American rapper and songwriter, consists of two studio albums, one independent album, six mixtapes, four collaborative mixtapes, and 8 singles (including 2 as a featured artist).

Albums

Studio albums

Independent Albums

Mixtapes

Collaborative mixtapes

EPs

Singles

As lead artist

As featured artist

Guest appearances

Notes

References 

Discographies of American artists
Hip hop discographies